State Highway Loop 390 (Loop 390) is a state highway loop that forms a partial beltway around Marshall, Texas.

Route description
Loop 390 begins at an intersection with State Highway 43 (SH 43, West Pinecrest Drive) in western Marshall. There is little development along the route at first, before seeing an increase in between University Avenue and Farm to Market Road 3379 (FM 3379, Houston Street) near Wiley College. Loop 390 intersects U.S. Highway 80 (US 80, W. Grand Avenue), FM 449, and SH 154 just west of East Texas Baptist University. Just north of SH 154, Loop 390 starts to turn toward the east and runs near the city limits of Marshall. In northwest Marshall, the highway has a brief overlap with FM 1997 before meeting US 59 (East End Boulevard). Near County Road 2100, Loop 390 starts to turn towards the south and has an interchange with SH 43 (Karnack Highway) in the eastern part of the city. Loop 390 runs in a slight southeast direction before ending at an intersection with US 80 (Victory Drive) near the city's eastern edge.

The section of highway between SH 43 and US 80 in western Marshall is known locally as Martin Luther King Jr. Boulevard. The rest of the highway is known locally as Ernest F. Smith Parkway.

History
Loop 390 was designated on August 31, 1965, running from I-20 southwest of Marshall and around the city before ending at I-20 southeast of the city. The section of highway between FM 3251 and US 80 was cancelled on September 14, 1990, with the mileage being transferred to FM 968. On January 28, 2005, the section of SH 154 between US 80 and SH 43 was re-designated as a part of Loop 390.

Future
TxDOT currently plans to upgrade the section of Loop 390 between US 59 and US 80 in eastern Marshall as a part of I-369. The Interstate will join Loop 390 near Poplar Street/County Road 2116 and will continue past US 80 and rejoin US 59 south of Marshall near FM 2625. Loop 390 will be extended south from US 80 east of Marshall southward to I-20 and will be built to Interstate standards in anticipation of a future I-369 designation. The extension is slated to begin construction in 2025.

Junction list

References

390
Transportation in Harrison County, Texas
Interstate 69
Marshall, Texas